In mathematics, the sign function or signum function (from signum, Latin for "sign") is a function that returns the sign of a real number.

Definition
The signum function of a real number  is a piecewise function which is defined as follows:

Properties

Any real number can be expressed as the product of its absolute value and its sign function:

It follows that whenever  is not equal to 0 we have

Similarly, for any real number ,

We can also ascertain that:

The signum function is the derivative of the absolute value function, up to (but not including) the indeterminacy at zero. More formally, in integration theory it is a weak derivative, and in convex function theory the subdifferential of the absolute value at 0 is the interval , "filling in" the sign function (the subdifferential of the absolute value is not single-valued at 0).

The signum function is differentiable with derivative 0 everywhere except at 0. It is not differentiable at 0 in the ordinary sense, but under the generalised notion of differentiation in distribution theory, 
the derivative of the signum function is two times the Dirac delta function, which can be demonstrated using the identity 

where  is the Heaviside step function using the standard  formalism.
Using this identity, it is easy to derive the distributional derivative:

The Fourier transform of the signum function is

where  means Cauchy principal value.

The signum can also be written using the Iverson bracket notation:

The signum can also be written using the floor and the absolute value functions:
The signum function has a very simple definition if  is accepted to be equal to 1. Then signum can be written for all real numbers as 

The signum function coincides with the limits

and 

For , a smooth approximation of the sign function is 

Another approximation is

This is inspired from the fact that the above is exactly equal for all nonzero  if , and has the advantage of simple generalization to higher-dimensional analogues of the sign function (for example, the partial derivatives of ).

See .

Complex signum
The signum function can be generalized to complex numbers as:

for any complex number  except .

where  is the complex argument function.

For reasons of symmetry, and to keep this a proper generalization of the signum function on the reals, also in the complex domain one usually defines, for : 

We then have (for ):

Generalized signum function
This generalized signum allows construction of the algebra of generalized functions, but the price of such generalization is the loss of commutativity. In particular, the generalized signum anticommutes with the Dirac delta function

( is not defined, but .)

Generalization to matrices
If   is invertible then such a decomposition is unique and   plays the role of 's signum. This leads to each invertible matrix having a unique left-signum  and right-signum .

In this sense, polar decomposition generalizes to matrices the signum-modulus decomposition of complex numbers.

See also
 Absolute value
 Heaviside function
 Negative number
 Rectangular function
 Sigmoid function (Hard sigmoid)
 Step function (Piecewise constant function)
 Three-way comparison
 Zero crossing
 Polar decomposition

Notes

Special functions
Unary operations